

National team

Intercontinental Futsal Cup

Futsal European Clubs Championship

Top League

6th Russian futsal championship 1997/1998

Promotion tournament

National Cup

Final Four

Top League Cup
6th Russian futsal Top League Cup

First League. Division A

First League Cup
Matches played at SKK «Oktuabrsky», Kemerovo from 28 April to 3 May 1998

First League. Division B

Women's League
6th Russian women futsal championship 1997/1998

Women's National Cup

References

Russia
Seasons in Russian futsal
futsal
futsal